Conasprella baileyi is a species of sea snail, a marine gastropod mollusk in the family Conidae, the cone snails and their allies.

Like all species within the genus Conasprella, these snails are predatory and venomous. They are capable of "stinging" humans, therefore live ones should be handled carefully or not at all.

Description
The size of the shell varies between 20 mm and 32 mm.

Distribution
This marine species occurs in the tropical Indo-West Pacific (the Philippines, Solomon Islands, New Caledonia, Loyalty Islands) and off Queensland, Australia.

References

 Röckel, D. & Motta, A.J. da 1979. New Cone from the Solomon Sea. La Conchiglia 11(126–127): 9
 Röckel, D., Korn, W. & Kohn, A.J. 1995. Manual of the Living Conidae. Volume 1: Indo-Pacific Region. Wiesbaden : Hemmen 517 pp
 Tucker J.K. & Tenorio M.J. (2009) Systematic classification of Recent and fossil conoidean gastropods. Hackenheim: Conchbooks. 296 pp
Conus (Gastropoda, Conidae) from offshore French Polynesia: Description of dredging from TARASOC expedition, with new records and new species. Xenophora Taxonomy 5: 26-49
  Puillandre N., Duda T.F., Meyer C., Olivera B.M. & Bouchet P. (2015). One, four or 100 genera? A new classification of the cone snails. Journal of Molluscan Studies. 81: 1–23

External links
 The Conus Biodiversity website
Cone Shells – Knights of the Sea
 

baileyi
Gastropods described in 1979